ABSW may refer to:

 ABSW (TV station), the Australian Broadcasting Corporation's TV station in Bunbury, Western Australia
 American Baptist Seminary of the West, a theological school
 Association of British Science Writers, the UK society for science writers, journalists and communicators
 Angry Birds Star Wars, a video game